Jang Na-ra (born March 18, 1981) is a South Korean singer and actress who has been active in both the South Korean and Chinese entertainment industries since 2001. She rose to prominence with her hit studio album Sweet Dream in 2002, and starred in well-received television series Successful Story of a Bright Girl (2002), My Love Patzzi (2002), Wedding (2005), My Bratty Princess (2005), You Are My Destiny (2014), Confession Couple (2017), The Last Empress (2018–2019), and VIP (2019).

Early life and education
Jang spent most of her childhood in her birthplace, Yeokchon-dong, Eunpyeong District, in Seoul, South Korea. She appeared with her father, Ju Ho-seong, who is also an actor, in the play Les Misérables in her primary school days, thus sparking her interest in becoming an actress. Jang also went on to become a model for television advertisements in her high school days before entering Chung-ang University's Department of Theater, Faculty of Fine Arts where she majored in Theater and Film in March 2000. She graduated 10 years later, on February 19, 2010. The delay was due to her continuous work since her debut after she entered the university. She also received an alumni association award for her contributions to the university during the graduation rites.

Career

Music
Jang made her debut in the entertainment world as a singer in May 2001. She started her singing career by becoming a trainee and by signing a contract with SM Entertainment.

Jang released her debut album First Story with the title track Burying My Face In Tears. Initially, it was not well-received and only reached number 12 in Korean music charts. After starring in the popular sitcom New Nonstop, she became more well-known and released the other tracks in the album such as her pop ballad style song, Confession and the April Story, ranked at the top in various music charts. The album sold 300,000 copies. Jang then became a host for MBC's music show, Music Camp and KBS's talk show Love Story. By the end of 2001, she received several New Female Artist awards from year-end Music Awards ceremonies and New MC awards from Entertainment Awards ceremonies.

In October 2002, Jang released her second album, Jjang Nara Vol.2 Sweet Dream. The song Sweet Dream became immensely popular and reached number 1 in Korean music charts, instantly making Jang a household name. The album also became one of the top selling albums of that year in South Korea. Due to the success of Sweet Dream, Jang won several awards, including two Daesang awards or the Grand Prize (equivalent to Korean Top Artist of the Year) from MBC Music Festival and KBS Music Awards. She also received the Korean Singer of the Year from China's CCTV-MTV Awards in 2003.

In December 2003, Jang released her third album, aptly titled 3rd Story, which included top tracks I am a Woman Too and Is That True?.

Jang released a Best Hits Album in 2004 consisting of songs from her 3 previous albums. She followed it up with her fourth album titled My Story released in December 2004, consisting of hit songs such as I Love School and Winter Diary.

With her popularity in China, she also made a career in music overseas by releasing Chinese-language albums. Her first Chinese album was a huge success, making her the first foreign artist in China with over 1 million copies sold. This was followed by the release of two more Chinese albums, Kungfu (2005) and Flying High (2006).

She returned to the Korean music scene in 2007 with her fifth Korean album entitled She, which consists of medium tempo Masquerade and the dance piece, You & I. The following year, she released a multi-lingual album titled Dream of Asia, which includes 26 songs in 5 languages, including Mandarin, Cantonese, Korean, Japanese, and English. Jang held a mini concert in Beijing to promote the album.
During the 2008 Beijing Summer Olympics, Jang was the only singer from a non-Chinese-speaking country to appear in the 2008 Olympic song, Beijing Welcomes You.

In 2009, she released a duet with Jimmy Lin for the soundtrack of their film Flying with You. The track was produced by famed Singaporean musician JJ Lin.
In 2012, four years after releasing Dream of Asia, Jang returned to the Korean music scene with the digital single I Only Think of You. The same year, she released her fourth Chinese album, Love Journey.

On May 20, 2018, Jang Na-Ra performed Sweet Dream, I am a Woman Too, April Story on Sugar Man season 2, which was the highest audience rating among all terrestrial and non-terrestrial programs broadcast at the same time. Sweet Dream by Jang Nara became the most-viewed performing video among all Sugar Man singers.

Acting career
Jang also has a successful acting career. She first appeared in the popular MBC TV sitcom New Nonstop, and received attention for her cute image.

In 2002, Jang landed her first leading role in a drama in SBS's romantic comedy Successful Story of a Bright Girl. The drama was well-received and recorded high audience ratings. She won the Best New TV Actress Award at the 2003 Baeksang Arts Awards. The success of the drama and her hit song "Sweet Dream" launched her to stardom in South Korea that year. The same year, she starred in another romantic comedy series, My Love Patzzi, which also attained high ratings.

In 2003, she made her feature film debut in the film Oh! Happy Day.

In 2004, she came back to the small screen and starred in MBC's weekend drama Love Is All Around, followed by KBS' romance drama Wedding. Wedding, which established Jang as an actress, and she received viewer acclaim for her portrayal of a woman's growth and identity in marriage.

In 2005, with her increasing popularity in China, she made a bold move by moving to China to start her singing and acting career. Her first mainstream Chinese drama was My Bratty Princess.  The success of My Bratty Princess catapulted her as a hallyu or Korean Wave star in China. She made several other drama series in China which includes Good Morning Shanghai in 2007, Iron Masked Singer in 2010, and Unruly Qiao in 2011.

In 2009, she returned to the big screen with Sky and Ocean, playing a gifted violinist with the mental age of a 6-year-old, diagnosed with Savant syndrome. The movie was a commercial failure, and was criticized for Jang's unfair nomination at the Grand Bell Awards even before the movie was released. However, despite the controversy, Jang won the Best Actress for a Foreign Film Award at the 19th China Golden Rooster and Hundred Flowers Awards. The film also became the first Asian film to be invited to the eighth Tirana International Film Festival in Albania, where it won the Media Award.

In May 2011, Jang starred in the KBS romantic-comedy Baby Faced Beauty. This marked her return to Korean screens after six years. The series averaged 10% ratings throughout its run and won favorable reviews. She later won the Excellence Award for an Actress in a mini-series at the 2011 KBS Drama Awards.

The following year, she filmed her first Chinese movie, Flying With You, starring opposite Taiwanese singer and actor Jimmy Lin. She also made a cameo appearance in another Chinese film starring Jaycee Chan titled Whoever. The same year, she appeared together with her father in a Chinese drama entitled Race Course.

In December 2012, Jang reunited with her Baby Faced Beauty co-star Choi Daniel for KBS's teen drama School 2013. She received her second consecutive Excellence Award for an Actress in a mini-series at the 2012 KBS Drama Awards.

After filming for School 2013 concluded, Jang immediately returned to China to film a drama titled Red Palanquin.

The year 2014 proved to be a busy year for Jang with three TV projects under MBC network. In July 2014, Jang played the lead role in You Are My Destiny, the Korean adaptation of the 2008 Taiwanese hit drama Fated to Love You. This TV series reunited her with Jang Hyuk 12 years after both starred in the highly rated drama Successful Story of a Bright Girl. You Are My Destiny was a hit in China and gained 200 million views. Shortly after, Jang starred in a one-episode drama special entitled Old Farewell for MBC's Drama Festival, pairing her once again with Jang Hyuk. She then took on the lead role opposite Shin Ha-kyun in the fantasy-romantic-comedy drama, Mr. Back. She later won the Top Excellence Award at the 2014 MBC Drama Awards for both television series she starred in that year.

In 2015, Jang played a police detective in the mystery thriller Hello Monster. In 2016, she starred in the romantic comedy One More Happy Ending, portraying a former pop idol.

In 2017, Jang was cast in the romantic fantasy drama Confession Couple. The series was a success, and won acclaim from viewers. She also won the Excellence Award for an Actress in a mini-series at the 2017 KBS Drama Awards.

In 2018, Jang was cast in the mystery thriller drama The Last Empress, playing a musical actress who becomes the Empress of a modern-day monarch. The series received high ratings and Jang was praised for her performance with her wide range in acting.

In 2019, Jang returned to the small screen with the office mystery drama VIP. She won the Producer Award for her role as Na Jeong-seon at the 2019 SBS Drama Awards.

In 2020, Jang starred in the romance comedy drama Oh My Baby as manager of a magazine, The Baby.

In 2021, she appeared in the occult TV series Sell Your Haunted House as Hong Ji-ah, an exorcist and CEO of Daebak Realty, a real estate company which only sells haunted properties.

Endorsements 
In 2002, Jang was named as 'CF Queen' by various news outlets. This is due to her rising number of product endorsements ranging from telecommunications (KTF),  automobile (KIA Spectra), fashion (SMART uniform), fast food (Popeyes), to alcoholic beverages (잎새주)

In March 2020, it was revealed that Jang had signed an exclusive model contract with air purifier brand 'Clair' back in December 2019. It was revealed that Jang would promote Clair's products not only in Korea but throughout Asia as well.

Jang signed a contract with Korean cosmetic brand 'CharmZone' as an official model, as revealed in April 2020. This was to promote the company's diversification into the inner beauty market.

Personal life
2002 was Jang's year, with best selling albums, multiple endorsements, and highly-rated TV shows under her belt. Her popularity throughout South Korea is massive, often dubbed as Jang Na-ra Syndrome. And eventually, her popularity extended to China and other Asian countries. However, her workload took a toll on her health. She disclosed in an interview on Healing Camp that she suffered from gastric ulcers, irritable bowel syndrome, panic disorder, bulimia, and acrophobia due to intense stress and pressure as a celebrity. She also halted her singing activities in 2014 due to stage phobia and focused her work on acting.

Jang belongs to a family of actors. Her father, Ju Ho-seong (real name Jang Yeon-kyo), is a theater actor, producer, and director. He has also been managing Jang's career since her debut. She has her own agency, Rawon Culture, which was established by her father.

Jang is also known for her youthful appearance  and has expressed her Christian faith numerous times at the SBS Drama Awards.

Marriage 
On June 3, 2022, Jang announced that she will be marrying her non-celebrity boyfriend, who is six years younger than her. Their private wedding ceremony was held on June 26, 2022.

Charity and other activities
Jang does much charity work such as sending 500 million won worth of commodities and 200 million won worth of powdered milk to the hungry North Korean children. She also established a US$10,000 Jang Na-ra scholarship foundation in the Philippines. She also works with the FHI Charity organization.

She served as the public relations envoy for fair elections in the 2002 South Korean presidential election. She renewed this commitment as she was chosen as one of the honorary public relations ambassadors for the 2017 South Korean presidential election.

In 2004, Jang was named public relations envoy for China by the Embassy in Korea of the People's Republic of China.

In 2007, Jang held a fund-raising concert for child patients of leukemia in China.  The Jang Foundation was established from the money raised during Jang's fan club meeting at her June 9 concert in Beijing, which was held to mark the 15th year of diplomatic relations between China and South Korea. Twelve hundred seats at the concert venue sold out early. After the concert on stage, a Chinese charity organization appointed Jang as a goodwill ambassador, making her the first foreigner to receive such an honor. The same year, she was appointed as one of the goodwill ambassadors for the China-ROK Exchange Year.

In the aftermath of the 2008 Sichuan earthquake, Jang donated 150,000 dollars to a charity organization in China and 8 billion won of clothing for the victims.

In June 2010, Jang was appointed as an associate professor at the Beijing Huajia University.

In 2011, Jang was appointed as Seoul’s Gangnam-gu's ambassador to promote tourism in the area.

Jang is also known to contribute her talent in singing for charitable causes. In 2013, she recorded a TV campaign song named “Nanoom Song” for the Community Chest of Korea. She also performed with Jackie Chan at his charity concert "Jackie Chan and his friends" on June 24, 2006, at Nanjing, Jiangsu province of China.

In 2015, Jang was recognized for her charity activities by the Ministry of Health and Welfare.

In 2017, it was revealed that Jang had secretly donated more than 13 billion won, or close to 12 million US dollars, since her debut in 2001 to various charities, disaster reliefs, and academic organizations. She is also known to have a big affection for animals. Aside from donating money to animal shelters, she also participates at charity events for animal care and volunteers actively for such things as cleaning sick dogs' shelters.

Discography

Korean studio albums

Chinese studio albums

Collaborative and compilation albums

Singles

Filmography

Awards and nominations

State honors

References

External links

 

1981 births
Living people
Actresses from Seoul
Singers from Seoul
Chung-Ang University alumni
South Korean rock singers
K-pop singers
South Korean mandopop singers
South Korean women pop singers
South Korean female idols
South Korean film actresses
South Korean television actresses
MAMA Award winners
21st-century South Korean singers
21st-century South Korean women singers